Pyrausta armeniaca is a moth in the family Crambidae. It was described by Slamka in 2013. It is found in Armenia.

References

Moths described in 2013
armeniaca
Moths of Europe
Moths of Asia